Cheshmeh Sefid (also Romanized as Cheshmeh Sefīd; also known as Kānī Charmow) is a village in Palanganeh Rural District, in the Central District of Javanrud County, Kermanshah Province, Iran. At the 2006 census, its population was 63, in 14 families.

References 

Populated places in Javanrud County